Soundart Radio 102.5 fm is an art radio station based in Dartington, Totnes, Devon, UK. Founded as a student radio station in 2006 by two graduates of Dartington College of Arts, Nell Harrison and Lucinda Guy, the station moved onto a full-time Community Radio Licence in February 2009 broadcasting to a 5 km radius around the transmitter at Dartington Hall.

Soundart Radio is a non-profit arts organisation with membership open to all. The station provides training and workshops encouraging creative use of radio and sound.

The station is a member of Radia and defines itself as 'a place to listen, play and experiment'.

References

Articles from local newspaper The Herald Express:

http://www.thisissouthdevon.co.uk/news/Radio-station-puts-art-air-24-hours-day/article-704037-detail/article.html Art on the Air
http://www.thisissouthdevon.co.uk/news/Radio-station-aims-build-team-programme-makers/article-1416292-detail/article.html Programme Makers
http://www.thisissouthdevon.co.uk/news/s-family-favourites-Soundart-Radio/article-965790-detail/article.html Family Favourites

External links 
 Official site
Archived Soundart Radio page from Dartington College of Arts

Community radio stations in the United Kingdom
Radio stations in Devon